This is a list of current and former fellows of University College, Oxford, sorted by broad academic disciplines. It does not include Masters, even if they were fellows of the college before their appointment.

Current

Humanities 
 William Allan, classicist
Karen O'Brien, English literature
 , Egyptologist
 Tian Yuan Tan, professor of Chinese
 , historian

Sciences 
 Jon Blundy, petrologist and geologist
 John Frederick Dewey, structural geologist
 Tao Dong, immunologist
 Elaine Fox, psychologist
 Daniel Freeman, psychologist
 Sarah Harper, gerontologist
 Jotun Hein, professor of bioinformatics
 Gideon Henderson, geochemist
 Laura Herz, physicist
 David Logan, theoretical chemist
 Tamsin Maher, earth scientist
 Peter Norreys, physicist
 Barry V. L. Potter, professor of medicinal and biological chemistry
 Rosalind Rickaby, biogeochemist
 Bill Roscoe, computer scientist
 John Wheater, physicist

Social sciences 
 Ruth Chang, professor of jurisprudence
 Ngaire Woods, professor of global economic governance and dean of the Blavatnik School of Government

Emeritus and former 
 John Finnis, legal philosopher
Joel David Hamkins, mathematician

References 

Fellows
University College